John Barclay may refer to:

Religion
John Barclay (Berean) (1734–1798), Scottish theological writer
John Barclay (clergyman) (1795–1826), Canadian Church of Scotland clergyman
John M. G. Barclay (born 1958), theologian and professor

Sports
John Barclay (cricketer) (born 1954), English/Hong Kong cricketer
John Barclay (rugby union) (born 1986), Scottish rugby union player

Others
John Barclay (poet) (1582–1621), Scottish satirist and Latin poet
John Barclay (anatomist) (1758–1826), Scottish anatomist
John Barclay, Captain in Danish-Norwegian military, 1643 to 1645, thought to have been the first male member of Clan Barclay
John Barclay (mayor) (1749–1824), American soldier, politician, and jurist; mayor of Philadelphia in 1791
John Barclay, survivor of the shipwreck of HMS Birkenhead in 1852
John Barclay (Royal Marines officer) (1741–1823), British Royal Marines general
John Barclay (New Jersey politician) ( 1650–1731), Scottish Quaker and politician

See also
John Barclay Armstrong (1850–1913), Texas ranger
John Berkeley (disambiguation)